Yu Jeong-jae (born 24 November 1970) is a South Korean equestrian. He competed in two events at the 1992 Summer Olympics.

References

1970 births
Living people
South Korean male equestrians
Olympic equestrians of South Korea
Equestrians at the 1992 Summer Olympics
Place of birth missing (living people)